Salpornis  is a genus of bird which is usually included in the family Certhiidae. The genus has in the past been included with the nuthatches in the family Sittidae or placed in a family of its own, the Salpornithidae. Molecular phylogenetic analyses show them to be definitely within the Certhioidea but still leaves some uncertainty about their placement in relation to the genera Sitta, Tichodroma and Certhia.  While they appear similar to the treecreepers (Certhia), they do not use their tails to support them while climbing and some molecular evidence shows them to be closer to the nuthatches (Sitta) while another study suggests a closer relation to the wallcreeper Tichodroma muraria. The generic name is derived from the Greek salpinktes for wren and ornis for bird.

The tail has twelve feathers and is rounded at the tips. The nostril is exposed and there are no rictal bristles. The tongue ends in five bristles.

The genus has two species with the African species earlier considered as a subspecies. Differences in size, calls and mitochondrial DNA sequences have supported the splitting of the African and Indian populations.
 Indian spotted creeper (Salpornis spilonota)
 African spotted creeper (Salpornis salvadori) with four subspecies.

References 

 
Taxa named by George Robert Gray